Commander George Truman Morrell RN (29 January 1830 – 7 May 1912) was a British naval, officer and explorer active during the Victorian era.

Early years

George Truman Morrell was born 29 January 1830 in Dinan, Brittany, France, a British subject.  He was the second son of a naval officer, Arthur Fleming Morrell, and Elizabeth Reid, who was the daughter of a pay officer at the Plymouth Dockyard.  His eldest brother, Charles Walter Morrell, died in 1839, aged 11.

His younger brother, Arthur Morrell, also born in Dinan became a Rear-Admiral in the Royal Navy.

Career
Morrell joined the Royal Navy in 1842 at age 12, a first class volunteer aboard HMS Calcutta, Captain George Frederick Rich commanding.

He would spend seven years as a midshipman, before becoming a mate aboard HMS Excellent in 1849.  He was then acting lieutenant on several occasions, before being confirmed to that rank in 1851.

In 1866, the Foreign Office reported on "great judgement" displayed by Morrell during a daring expedition up the Niger River aboard HMS Investigator, a journey he documented in his journal.

During his naval career, Morrell served aboard the following ships:

 1842, HMS Calcutta
 1842–1843, HMS Monarch
 1843–1845, HMS Aigle
 1845, HMS Formidable
 1845, HMS Siren
 1849, HMS Excellent
 1849–1850, HMS Phoenix
 1850–1851, HMS Helia
 1851–1852, HMS Philomel
 1852–1853, HMS Daring
 1853–1856, HMS Imaum
 1861–1865, HMS Wellesley
 1865, HMS Espoir
 1865, HMS Investigator
 1865–1866, HMS Sparrow
 1866, HMS Espoir
 1866–1867, HMS Wellesley
 1867, HMS Fisgard
 1867–1868, HMS Wellesley
 1869–1873, HMS Trafalgar

He was paid off from the navy in 1869, and then served for a short period with the coast guard in Sligo, Ireland, as a division lieutenant.  He documented his final year of service in Ireland in another journal, filled with details such as the loss of ships and crew, the recovery of drowning victims ("30th June - Bodies of two young women aged about 16 & 18 both sweetly pretty, laying in our boat house, having been brought off Black rocks near L. House on Saturday, to await coroner's inquest on Monday, 30th June"), and discipline meted out to coast guardsmen ("Sept. 9th - Mr. King to lose one good conduct stripe").

Marriage and family
Morrell married Ellen Mary Stretton (born c. 1835 - died 21 December 1903), of Islington, in a ceremony on 29 August 1861, at St Michael, Highgate, Middlesex. The family was mainly settled in Kent, however his son Patrick was born in Dublin, Ireland, during his service in the coast guard.

Together, they had at least 10 children: 
 Arthur Wellesley Morrell, who also joined the Royal Navy, becoming a Paymaster Captain
 William George Henry Morrell, another naval officer
 Rosa Elizabeth Morrell
 Douglas Henry Morrell, another naval officer, who died in 1903
 Alice Fanny Morrell
 Maud Lucy Morrell
 Patrick Frank Arthur Morrell, later a vicar
 Edith Georgina Morrell
 George Edwin Morrell
 Frank Alfred Morrell

Death
George Truman Morrell lived in Belvedere, Kent, at the time of his death on 7 May 1912.

First West Africa expedition 
 
In the early 1860s Morrell made maps of several parts of the coast of West Africa, including what has since become the southwestern parts of Ivory Coast. 

He also observed native fauna in that region such as the pygmy hippopotamus and western chimpanzee. People in the region spoke the Guéré language which Morrell attempted to document. Travelling further along the coast on the same expedition he made extensive maps of an area further east, near the settlement of Assinie-Mafia where he made maps of the Aby Lagoon and the surrounding area. 
 

After this Morrell returned to England and took up residency in the Cotswolds region.

Niger River expedition  
Due to the success of his previous mission to West Africa, Morrell was given command of another, far more ambitious expedition. 

In late 1865, Morrell, who was then a lieutenant, was given command of HMS Investigator, a steam-powered, flat-bottomed British navy gunship. He spent the next several months steaming the ship up the Niger River, bringing gifts from the British government, in Queen Victoria's name, to tribal kings and elders along the river.

During the voyage, Morrell mediated a dispute between British colonists and Obi Akazue, who reigned amongst the people at Onitsha, Nigeria. He observed first-hand the slave trade, which flourished locally despite the cessation of the trade throughout most of the western world.

He recorded his interactions in a handwritten diary, including coloured illustrations of aspects of contemporary West African life along the river, such as this drawing of a brass canoe fitted with an awning and armed with cannons, used for local trade along the river.

External links
 Footnotes Winter 2001 edition, Northwestern University newsletter, article on p. 6 highlighting the acquisition of the 1865 journal (PDF)

References

Other sources:
 1881 British Census, Kent

1830 births
1912 deaths
Royal Navy officers
British explorers of Africa
People from Dinan